

Ancient Times

Egyptian Empire

circa 1279 B.C.E. — 1213 B.C.E. Ramesses II's Campaigns in Libya

Carthaginian Empire
264 B.C.E. — 146 B.C.E. Punic Wars

Kingdom of Numidia
112 B.C.E. — 106 B.C.E. Jugurthine War

Roman Province of Africa
193 C.E. – 211 C.E. Military activity of Septimius Severus
203 C.E. The Roman Emperor Septimius Severus launched a campaign deep into the Sahara, capturing the capital city of the Garamantian Empire Germa, but he abandoned it soon after.
439 C.E. The Vandals overran the Roman Province of Africa

Medieval Times

Vandal Kingdom
June 533 C.E. — March 534 C.E. Vandalic War

Diplomatic preparations and revolts in Tripolitania and Sardinia
Spring 533 C.E. Anti-Vandal revolt in Tripolitania; Byzantine troops from  Cyrenaica occupy the province

Byzantine Praetorian prefecture of Africa
The Moorish Wars
534 C.E. First Moorish uprising
544 C.E. Second Moorish uprising and the revolt of Guntharic

Byzantine Exarchate of Africa
647 C.E. — 709 C.E. Muslim conquest of the Maghreb
669 C.E. The city Germa was conquered by Uqba ibn Nafi.

Ayyubid dynasty
1171 C.E. — 1172 C.E. Conquest of North Africa and Nubia

Mamluk Sultanate of Egypt
1551 C.E. Ottoman conquest

Modern Times

Ottoman Eyalet of Tripolitania
June 30, 1793 C.E. — January 20, 1795 C.E. Tripolitanian civil war
May 10, 1801 C.E. — June 10, 1805 C.E. First Barbary War
April 27, 1805 C.E. — May 13, 1805 C.E. Battle of Derne
February 1820 C.E. — October 1822 C.E. Invasion of Libya and Sudan

Ottoman Vilayet of Tripolitania
September 29, 1911 C.E. — October 18, 1912 C.E. Italo-Turkish War
1911 C.E. — 1943 C.E. Libyan resistance movement

Italian Libya
September 29, 1911 C.E. — October 18, 1912 C.E. Italo-Turkish War
1911 C.E. — 1943 C.E. Libyan resistance movement
1915 C.E. Gasr Bu Hadi
July 28, 1914 C.E. — November 11, 1918 C.E. World War I
1914 C.E. — 1918 C.E. North African theatre
September 1, 1939 C.E. — September 2, 1945 C.E. World War II
June 10, 1940 C.E. — May 2, 1945 C.E. Mediterranean and Middle East theatre of World War II
June 10, 1940 C.E. — May 13, 1943 C.E. North African Campaign
June 11, 1940 C.E. — February 4, 1943 C.E. Western Desert Campaign
January 3 — January 5, 1941 C.E. Battle of Bardia
January 31, 1941 C.E. — March 1, 1941 C.E. Battle of Kufra
May 26 — June 21, 1942 C.E. Battle of Gazala
May 26 — June 11, 1942 C.E. Battle of Bir Hakeim
December 11 — December 18, 1942 C.E. Battle of El Agheila

Allied occupation of Libya
June 1,948 C.E. Anti-Jewish rioters in Libya killed 12 Jews and destroyed 280 Jewish homes

Kingdom of Libya
Chadian Civil War (1965–1979)
September 1, 1,969 C.E. Libyan coup

Libyan Arab Republic
September 1, 1,969 C.E. Libyan coup

Great Socialist People's Libyan Arab Jamahiriya
1,947 C.E. — 1,991 C.E. Cold War
August 19, 1,981 C.E. Gulf of Sidra incident
March, 1,986 C.E. Action in the Gulf of Sidra
April 15, 1,986 C.E. United States bombing of Libya
January 4, 1,989 C.E. Gulf of Sidra incident
July 21, 1,977 C.E. — July 24, 1,977 C.E. Libyan—Egyptian War
1,978 C.E. — 1,987 C.E. Chadian-Libyan conflict
1,983 C.E. — 1,984 C.E. Operation Manta
February 13, 1,986 C.E. — ongoing Opération Épervier
December 16, 1,986 C.E. — September 11, 1,987 C.E. Toyota War

National Transitional Council of Libya
December 18, 2,010 C.E. — ongoing Arab Spring
2,011 C.E. — ongoing Libyan Crisis
February 15, 2,011 C.E. — October 23, 2,011 C.E. Libyan Civil War
February 15, 2,011 C.E. — February 20, 2,011 C.E. First Battle of Benghazi
February 17, 2,011 C.E. — February 25, 2,011 C.E. Tripoli protests and clashes
February 18, 2,011 C.E. — May 15, 2,011 C.E. Battle of Misrata
February 24, 2,011 C.E. — March 10, 2,011 C.E. First Battle of Zawiya
March 1, 2,011 C.E. — August 18, 2,011 C.E. Nafusa Mountains campaign
April 21, 2,011 C.E. Battle of Wazzin
August 13, 2,011 C.E. — August 18, 2,011 C.E. Battle of Gharyan
March 2, 2,011 C.E. First Battle of Brega
March 19, 2,011 C.E. — October 31, 2,011 C.E. Military intervention in Libya
March 19, 2,011 C.E. — October 31, 2,011 C.E. Operation Ellamy
March 19, 2,011 C.E. — March 31, 2,011 C.E. Opération Harmattan
March 19, 2,011 C.E. — November 1, 2,011 C.E. Operation Mobile
March 19, 2,011 C.E. — March 31, 2,011 C.E. Operation Odyssey Dawn
March 23, 2,011 C.E. — October 31, 2,011 C.E. Operation Unified Protector

State of Libya
December 18, 2,010 C.E. — ongoing Arab Spring
2,011 C.E. — ongoing Libyan Crisis
November 1, 2011 C.E. — May 16, 2014 C.E. Factional violence in Libya
January 23, 2,012 C.E. — January 25, 2,012 C.E. Bani Walid uprising
February 12, 2,012 C.E. — July 1, 2,012 C.E. Kufra conflict
March 25, 2,012 C.E. — March 31, 2,012 C.E. Sabha conflict
June 4, 2,012 C.E. Tripoli airport clashes
June 11, 2,012 C.E. — June 18, 2,012 C.E. Zintan clashes
September 9, 2,012 C.E. — October 26, 2,012 C.E. Siege of Bani Walid
September 11, 2,012 C.E. — September 12, 2,012 C.E. Benghazi attack
June 8, 2,013 C.E. — June 15, 2,013 C.E. Benghazi conflict
February 14, 2014 C.E. — May 2,014 C.E. Libyan coup d'état attempts
May 16, 2,014 C.E. — ongoing Second Libyan Civil War
May 16, 2,014 C.E. — ongoing Operation Dignity
July 13, 2,014 C.E. — August 23, 2,014 C.E. Battle of Tripoli Airport
October 5, 2,014 C.E. — ongoing ISIL takeover of Derna
January 27, 2,015 C.E. Corinthia Hotel attack
February 8, 2,015 C.E. — February 9, 2,015 C.E. Fall of Nofaliya
February 12, 2,015 C.E. Kidnapping and beheading of Copts in Libya
February 16, 2,015 C.E. — ongoing Egyptian military intervention in Libya

References

See also
List of wars involving Libya
Libyan Army (1951–2011)
Libyan Air Force (1951–2011)
Libyan Air Force (2011–present)
Libyan National Army
Libyan Navy
Armed Forces of the Libyan Arab Jamahiriya
Military history of Africa
African military systems to 1,800 C.E.
African military systems 1,800 C.E. — 1,900 C.E.
African military systems after 1,900 C.E.

Battles involving Libya
Military history of Libya
Conflicts